The KD Subdivision is a railroad line owned by CSX Transportation in the U.S. states of Kentucky and Tennessee. At its north end it continues south from the Corbin Terminal Subdivision and at its south end it continues south as the Etowah Subdivision.

See also
 List of CSX Transportation lines

References

CSX Transportation lines
Transportation in Knox County, Kentucky
Transportation in Whitley County, Kentucky